Robert Stewart was an American football coach. He served as the 11th head football coach for Washburn University in Topeka, Kansas and he held that position for two seasons, from 1909 until 1910. His record at Washburn was 8–8. Stewart also served as the athletic director at Washburn for one year.

Head coaching record

References

Year of birth missing
Year of death missing
Washburn Ichabods football coaches
Washburn Ichabods athletic directors